The Norwegian Bar Association is an association of Norwegian lawyers. As of 2008 the association had about 7,000 members. Among its publications are the journals Norsk Retstidende and Rettens Gang.

Leaders
As of 2018, the association is chaired by Jens Johan Hjort, while Merete Smith has been secretary-general since 2003. Former leaders of the association include Valentin Voss (1938–1941), Henning Bødtker (1941 and 1945–1947), Sven Arntzen (1959–1961), Jens Christian Mellbye (1965–1968), Per Brunsvig (1976–1979), and Berit Reiss-Andersen (2008–2012).

References

Organizations established in 1908
1908 establishments in Norway
Organisations based in Oslo